Inside the Mafia is a 1959 film noir crime film based on a true incident. It was based on the Albert Anastasia murder and subsequent Apalachin Meeting.

Plot
The gangster Augie Martello is riddled with bullets in an assassination attempt organized by Tony Ledo, a mob lieutenant. Mafia boss Johnny Lucero is returning after 10 years out of the country. Ledo intends to kill Lucero and take over.

The family of airstrip traffic controller Rod Balcom, including his daughters, is taken hostage as the gang members await Lucero's plane, with gunman Sam Galey assigned to stand guard over them. Ledo intends to have the entire family killed after Martello's death and his planned takeover, but Lucero gets the drop on him and shoots Ledo to death. Lucero is then captured by the police.

Cast
 Cameron Mitchell as Tony Ledo
 Robert Strauss as Sam Galey
 Grant Richards as Johnny Lucero
 Ted de Corsia as Augie Martello
 Carol Nugent as Sandy Balcom
 Elaine Edwards as Anne Balcom
 Edward Platt as Dan Regent
 James Brown as Capt. Blair
 Louis Jean Heydt as Rod Balcom

See also
 Three Came to Kill (1960) – A similar film by Edward L. Cahn with Cameron Mitchell
 List of American films of 1959

References

External links

1959 films
1950s English-language films
American black-and-white films
American crime films
1959 crime films
Crime films based on actual events
Films directed by Edward L. Cahn
Films scored by Albert Glasser
Films about the American Mafia
United Artists films
Film noir
1950s American films